SMK Seri Kembangan is a school located in Seri Kembangan, Selangor, Malaysia, on top of a hill in Bukit Serdang. It was built in 1966 and officially opened on 19 November 1968 by the late Tunku Abdul Razak. It has 3,600 students and 200 staff.

Naming of the school

Originally, the school was named SMJK (Inggeris) Serdang Bharu. The reason for the name is attributed to the government policy of changing English secondary schools to national schools, with Bahasa Melayu as the medium of language.

Blocks A and B
 Block A is located beside the main school hall, it serves mainly as the venue of the living skills department (kemahiran hidup). It also houses the prayer room (Surau) and the Tamil language class room.
 Block B serves as the administrative building, disciplinary department, printing room, book shop, student's toilet and nine classrooms.

Blocks D and E
Block D houses the library, computer lab, living skills class room (ERT), Data room, two science labs and 5 class rooms.
Block E houses two science labs and eight classrooms.

Blocks C and F
Block C serves as the school mini hall. Block C also houses the co-op (Koperasi), school band room and also the Counseling Room).

Block F houses nine classrooms and a students' toilet.

Block G and H
 Block G houses the teaching staff room, Resource Room and staff toilet.
 Block H has two classrooms and a religious study room (Islamic).

Other infrastructure

External links

 SMK Seri Kembangan – Make Impossible Possible

Schools in Selangor
Secondary schools in Malaysia
Educational institutions established in 1965
1965 establishments in Malaysia